The 1988 United States presidential election in Connecticut took place on November 8, 1988, as part of the 1988 United States presidential election, which was held throughout all 50 states and D.C. Voters chose eight representatives, or electors to the Electoral College, who voted for president and vice president.

Connecticut voted for the Republican nominee, Vice President George H. W. Bush, over the Democratic nominee, Massachusetts Governor Michael Dukakis, by a margin of 5.10%. Bush took 51.98% of the vote to Dukakis's 46.87%. This result nonetheless made Connecticut 2.7% more Democratic than the nation-at-large.  

Although Dukakis won only Hartford County, he took 47-49% of the vote in 5 other counties, making it a close race statewide. He came much closer to winning the state than Walter Mondale, who had lost the state by over 20 points four years earlier. Dukakis's gains reflected liberal New England's drift as a whole toward the Democratic Party, as the Republican Party became increasingly conservative and oriented toward the South. This would be the last time that a Republican presidential candidate would win Connecticut's electoral votes, as the state has gone Democratic in every election since, and also one of the last times that a Republican won a statewide federal election there. This is also, as of 2022, the last time that Connecticut voted more Republican than Iowa and Wisconsin. 

, this is the last election in which the counties of New Haven, New London, Middlesex and Tolland voted for the Republican candidate. Also, this was the most recent election in which the Republican nominee carried the following municipalities: Andover, Branford, Canaan, Canton, Chester, Clinton, Columbia, Cromwell, Deep River, East Lyme, Farmington, Glastonbury, Groton, Guilford, Hebron, Kent, Norfolk, Norwalk, Old Lyme, Salisbury, Sharon, South Windsor, Stamford, Stonington, Tolland, Vernon, Washington, Waterbury, Waterford, Westport, Wethersfield, Willington, and Woodbridge.

Results

Results by county

See also
 United States presidential elections in Connecticut

References

Connecticut
1988
1988 Connecticut elections